Monocrepidius falli, the southern potato wireworm, is a species of click beetle in the family Elateridae.

References

Elateridae
Articles created by Qbugbot